Fernando Rogério de Alcântara (born 1 January 1966) is a Brazilian football manager who is a coach for American youth club Phoenix Brazas SC.

Career
Alcantara started his managerial career with Salgueiro Atlético Clube. In 2015, he was appointed head coach of the Timor-Leste national football team, a position he held until 2016. After that, he coached Atlético Clube Paranavaí and Associação Acadêmica e Desportiva Vitória das Tabocas.

References

External links
 Real Madrid, Messi, Timor-Leste and FIFA scandal: a Brazilian coach abroad 
 Brazilian leads selection with soldier, driver and drink and celebrates defeat 7-0 
 Side B: East Timor seeks evolution with Portuguese in schools and Brazilians in the field 
 Alcantara keeps it positive in spite of loss
 Discover the work philosophy of Fernando Alcântara, U-20 coach 

1966 births
Living people
Brazilian football managers
Pouso Alegre Futebol Clube managers
Paulista Futebol Clube managers
Salgueiro Atlético Clube managers
Timor-Leste national football team managers
Brazilian expatriate sportspeople
Expatriate football managers in Spain
Brazilian expatriate sportspeople in Spain
Expatriate football managers in Saudi Arabia
Brazilian expatriate sportspeople in Saudi Arabia
Expatriate football managers in Japan
Brazilian expatriate sportspeople in Japan
Expatriate football managers in East Timor
Brazilian expatriate sportspeople in East Timor